Elachista pomerana is a moth of the family Elachistidae found in Europe.

Description

The larvae feed on common wild oat (Avena fatua), wood small-reed (Calamagrostis epigejos),  floating sweet-grass (Glyceria fluitans), reed canary grass (Phalaris arundinacea) and common meadow-grass (Poa pratensis). The larvae create a mine which begins near the leaf tip and descends towards the base, occupying the entire width of the blade. The pupation takes place outside of the mine.

Distribution
It is found from Fennoscandia to the Alps and from Great Britain to Romania.

References

pomerana
Leaf miners
Moths described in 1870
Moths of Europe
Taxa named by Heinrich Frey